The Barbie Murders is a  1980 collection of science fiction stories by American writer John Varley. The book was republished under the title Picnic on Nearside in 1984.

Contents
The collection includes nine stories:
 "Bagatelle", originally published in Galaxy Science Fiction, August 1976
 "The Funhouse Effect", originally published in The Magazine of Fantasy & Science Fiction, December 1976
 "The Barbie Murders", originally published in Isaac Asimov's Science Fiction Magazine, February 1978
 "Equinoctial", originally published in Ascents of Wonder, 1977
 "Manikins", originally published in Amazing Stories, January 1976
 "Beatnik Bayou", originally published in New Voices III, 1980
 "Good-Bye, Robinson Crusoe", originally published in Isaac Asimov's Science Fiction Magazine, Spring 1977
 "Lollipop and the Tar Baby", originally published in Orbit 19, 1977
 "Picnic on Nearside", originally published in The Magazine of Fantasy & Science Fiction, August 1974
All of the stories but "Manikins" take place in Varley's Eight Worlds future history.

Awards
The Barbie Murders won the 1981 Locus Award for Best Single-Author Collection.

References

External links

Eight Worlds series
1980 short story collections